Éric Ollivier, pseudonym for Yves Duparc, (21 November 1926 – 30 January 2015) was a French writer, screenwriter and journalist, laureate of several French literary awards.

Biography

Youth 
Éric Ollivier's mother (Theresa Marie Ourvouai) was of Irish descent, his father (Arthur Victor Marie Duparc) was a sailor and poet. Orphaned at the age of eight, he was sent from Brittany to Paris at the end of 1940 by his family. He then studied at Lycée Henri-IV and practiced scouting. Having failed his baccalauréat exams, he enrolled at the Institut national des langues et civilisations orientales where he contributed to a dictionary of Amharic. Jean Cocteau, to whom he wrote, gave him a small role in the film Ruy Blas (1948), of which Jean Marais was the star.

Secretary to François Mauriac 
Eric Ollivier became the secretary of writer François Mauriac from October 1946 to Spring of 1948, when he was called up to carry out his military service. He became a journalist for the daily newspaper Le Figaro in 1949, and was sent to report from Libya, Tunisia and Morocco. He was also a war correspondent in Indochina, a senior reporter in India and Africa. He directly experienced, on the spot, the independence of Morocco and Tunisia.

As a novelist, he was awarded the Prix Roger Nimier for J'ai cru trop longtemps aux vacances in 1967 ; the Prix Cazes for Panne sèche in 1976, the Prix Interallié for L'Orphelin de mer... ou les Mémoires de monsieur Non in 1982, the Prix Sainte-Beuve in 1987 for Les livres dans la peau, and the Prix Charles Oulmont in 1993 for Lettre à mon genou. Author of around thirty books, he was also a television producer and worked for the cinema writing scenarios and dialogue.

The Académie française bestowed on him its Prix Jean Leduc in 1972 for Églantine and its Prix d'Académie in 1986 for all his works.

Éric Ollivier died on 30 January 2015 at Rueil-Malmaison of intestinal cancer.

Work 
1958: L'Officier de soleil, Éditions Denoël
1960: Les Enracinés, Sagittaire
1963: La Cohorte, Plon
1959: Les Godelureaux, adapted to the cinema (Les Godelureaux) in 1961 by Claude Chabrol, with Jean-Claude Brialy
1965: Le Jeune Homme à l'impériale, La Table ronde 
1967: J'ai cru trop longtemps aux vacances, Denoël, (Prix Roger Nimier)
1970: Les Malheurs d'Annie
1971: Passe-L'Eau, Denoël
1974: Une femme raisonnable, Denoël
1976: Panne sèche, Denoël, (Prix Cazes-Brasserie Lipp)
1980: Le temps me dure un peu, Denoël
1982: L'Orphelin de mer... ou les Mémoires de Monsieur Non, Denoël, (Prix Interallié)
1985: L'Arrière-saison
1987: Humeurs chroniques
1987: Le Faux Pas
1987: Les Livres dans la peau
1989: Venise, à tous les temps
1991: La Loi d'exil, Grasset
1984: L'Escalier des heures glissantes, Gallimard
1993: Lettre à mon genou
1994: Sur les chemins de France, et puis un peu d'ailleurs, Denoël
1996: La nature est ma seconde nature, Grasset / Fasquelle
1999: À fleur des cœurs, Grasset
2000: Ma langue aux chats, Les Belles Lettres, written in collaboration with Bruno Maso
2002: De longues vacances, Grasset
2005: Un air de fin des temps, Flammarion
2013: Avant de partir, Grasset

Filmography 
Cinema; screenwriter or dialoguiste
 1961: Les Godelureaux, film by Claude Chabrol, with Bernadette Lafont, Jean-Claude Brialy and Jean Tissier
 1963: Dragées au poivre, film by Jacques Baratier, with Guy Bedos, Jean-Paul Belmondo, Francis Blanche and Sophie Daumier
 1965: L'Or du duc, film by Jacques Baratier, with Claude Rich,  and Jacques Dufilho
 1971: Églantine, film by Jean-Claude Brialy, with Valentine Tessier, Claude Dauphin and Odile Versois

Television
 1966: Un beau dimanche, Television film by François Villiers, with Jean-Pierre Aumont

References

External links 
 L’écrivain et journaliste Eric Ollivier s’est éteint on Le Monde
 La mort de l'écrivain et journaliste Éric Ollivier on Le Figaro
 Éric Ollivier a pris la clé du large on Valeurs Actuelles
 Éric Ollivier on the site of the Académie française

20th-century French novelists
Lycée Henri-IV alumni
20th-century French journalists
French screenwriters
Roger Nimier Prize winners
Prix Interallié winners
Prix Sainte-Beuve winners
Writers from Brest, France
1926 births
2015 deaths
Deaths from cancer in France